Arkhanhelske is an urban-type settlement in Beryslav Raion of Kherson Oblast in Ukraine. It is located on the left bank of the Inhulets, a tributary of the Dnieper. Arkhanhelske belongs to Vysokopillia settlement hromada, one of the hromadas of Ukraine. It has a population of

Administrative status 
Until 18 July, 2020, Arkhanhelske belonged to Vysokopillia Raion. The raion was abolished in July 2020 as part of the administrative reform of Ukraine, which reduced the number of raions of Kherson Oblast to five. The area of Vysokopillia Raion was merged into Beryslav Raion.

Economy

Transportation
There is infrequent passenger traffic.

Arkhanhelske is connected by road with Beryslav via Velyka Oleksandrivka and with Nikopol via Novovorontsovka.

See also 

 Russian occupation of Kherson Oblast

References

Urban-type settlements in Beryslav Raion